{{DISPLAYTITLE:C26H34O4}}
The molecular formula C26H34O4 (molar mass: 410.55 g/mol, exact mass: 410.2457 u) may refer to:

 Methestrol dipropionate
 Trenbolone hexahydrobenzylcarbonate, or trenbolone cyclohexylmethylcarbonate